The Young Men's Hebrew Association (also known as the Maceo Elk Lodge #8) is a historic site in Jacksonville, Florida, United States. It is located at 712 West Duval Street. On October 29, 1992, it was added to the U.S. National Register of Historic Places.Young Men's Hebrew Association was an organization founded in Baltimore in 1854 to provide community services to Jewish neighborhoods.

References

External links
 Duval County listings at National Register of Historic Places
 Florida's Office of Cultural and Historical Programs
 Duval County listings
 Young Men's Hebrew Association

Buildings and structures in Jacksonville, Florida
History of Jacksonville, Florida
National Register of Historic Places in Jacksonville, Florida